The A970 is a single-carriageway road that runs from south to north of Mainland Shetland, Scotland. The road also spurs to Scalloway and North Roe.

The road crosses the end of a runway at Sumburgh Airport. The road is closed with barriers when flights are taking off or landing.

References

Roads in Scotland
Transport in Shetland